Aïcha Hamidèche (born 2 October 2001) is an Algerian footballer who plays as a midfielder for Afak Relizane and the Algeria women's national team.

Club career
Hamidèche has played for Afak Relizane in Algeria.

International career
Hamidèche capped for Algeria at senior level during the 2021 Arab Women's Cup.

References

External links

2001 births
Living people
Footballers from Oran
Algerian women's footballers
Women's association football midfielders
Algeria women's international footballers
21st-century Algerian people